Oguzhan (formerly Gulanly) is a town in Murgap District, Mary Region, Turkmenistan. Prior to 9 November 2022, it was the capital of Oguzhan District, which was abolished by parliamentary decree. It is the site of a fertilizer depot and a cotton yard.

Etymology
Oguzhan is the Turkmen spelling of Oghuz Khagan, the mythical progenitor of the Turkic nations, and the town was renamed in his honor. Atanyyazow is silent on the significance or origin of the name Gulanly, which literally means "with wild asses" (gulan "wild ass" + -ly "with").

Transportation
Oguzhan features a station of the same name on a branch of the Trans-Caspian Railway built between 1992 and 1996 that leads from Parahat junction to Sarahs and onward to Iran.  The town is also served by the P-9 highway.

References

Populated places in Mary Region